The Deutsch-Französisches Gymnasium Hamburg (DFG) or Lycée Franco-Allemand Hambourg (LFA) is a public, French-German school in Hamburg, Germany, and part of the Agency for French Education Abroad (AEFE) network.

The DFG/LFA is a secondary school and welcomes students from fifth to twelfth grade (equivalent to German Gymnasium and French collège and lycée). Like all Lycées Franco-Allemands, it prepares them for the Bac Franco-Allemand, a high school diploma recognised by France as equivalent to the Baccalauréat and by Germany as equivalent to the Abitur diploma.

Until August 2020, the Gymnasium/Lycée was known as Lycée Français de Hambourg Antoine de Saint-Exupéry and was operated jointly with the nursery and primary school École Française de Hambourg Antoine de Saint-Exupéry. For the 2020/21 academic year, it took its current name and status as a DFG / LFA.

See also
 
 La Gazette de Berlin
Deutsch-Französisches Gymnasium / Lycée Franco-Allemand
DFG/LFA Buc
DFG/LFA Freiburg
DFG/LFA Saarbrücken

References

External links
  Lycée Franco-Allemand Hambourg at the AEFE overseas school website
  Lycée Franco-Allemand Hambourg (fifth to twelfth, final grade)
  École Française de Hambourg Antoine de Saint-Exupéry (nursery to fourth grade)

International schools in Hamburg
Buildings and structures in Eimsbüttel
French international schools in Germany